RGU may refer to:

 Rajiv Gandhi University, India
 Remote graphics unit, a computer control device
 Robert Gordon University, Scotland
 Royal Global University, India
 Russell Gaelic Union, Downpatrick, Gaelic football club, Ireland
 ISO 639:rgu, the ISO code for the Ringgou language